Garry Brady (born 7 September 1976) is a Scottish former footballer.

Career
Brady began his career with Tottenham Hotspur in 1993 as a teenager, making around a dozen senior appearances before joining Newcastle United in 1998; the £650,000 transfer fee was decided by tribunal, with Brady having allowed his Tottenham contract to expire in the hope of more first team appearances elsewhere.  Lauded as "one of the brightest prospects in British football" at the time, Brady made a similar number of appearances at St James' Park but his time on Tyneside was blighted with a serious ankle injury limiting his opportunities.

The Scottish under-18 international winger moved with Des Hamilton to Norwich on loan in March 2000, to the end of the 1999–2000 season. On 4 September 2000, Brady returned to Carrow Road on a two-month loan, with a special entitlement allowing him to play in League Cup matches. His loan period expired on 26 October 2000 with Norwich declining to make the move permanent. Brady was released by Newcastle in January 2001 and subsequently joined Portsmouth on trial on 12 February 2001 before signing a permanent deal.

Falling out of favour, Brady joined Scottish side Kilmarnock on trial at the end of January 2002 but returned to Portsmouth to make a four league appearances that season. In July 2002, he joined Walsall on trial and returned to Scotland the following month on trial with Dundee. This move became permanent during the first week of September 2002. He came off the bench in the 2003 Scottish Cup Final which Dundee lost 1–0 to Rangers and also played in the following season's UEFA Cup. In mid-June 2006, after four years at Dens Park, Brady agreed terms with Scottish Premier League newcomers St Mirren, having turned down a request from Dundee – like several other players – to accept a wage cut. He appeared for St Mirren in the 2010 Scottish League Cup Final, another defeat to Rangers, although he was named Man of the Match.

In June 2011 he joined Brechin City. He scored his first and only league goal for Brechin in a 3-1 defeat to Cowdenbeath. At the end of the 2012–13 season, Brechin announced that Brady was amongst the players being released.

Personal life
His younger brother Darren was also a footballer whose clubs included Raith Rovers.

He has assisted Andy McLaren (a fellow former footballer and childhood resident of Glasgow's Castlemilk district) in operating McLaren's A&M charity offering football coaching and guidance to children in deprived areas.

Career statistics

References

External links
Career Information on Flown from the Nest website

Living people
1976 births
Footballers from Glasgow
Scottish footballers
Scottish Premier League players
Tottenham Hotspur F.C. players
Newcastle United F.C. players
Norwich City F.C. players
Portsmouth F.C. players
Dundee F.C. players
Brechin City F.C. players
St Mirren F.C. players
Premier League players
English Football League players
Scottish Football League players
Association football midfielders
Scotland youth international footballers